Charles Rolls (2 June 1799 – 9 November 1885) was a British engraver of mainly historical and figurative artworks. In a long career he created engravings from paintings by many notable 19th century artists.

Biography
Rolls was born on 2 June 1799 in Grange Road, Bermondsey, London (then in Surrey) to non-conformist parents, William and Mary Rolls.

Early in his career, in 1923, he was proposed for the Artists' Annuity and Benevolent Fund, one of his sponsors being the engraver Francis Engleheart.

Most of Rolls work was for book-illustrations and he also worked for J S Virtue & Co, the publisher of The Art Journal.

The celebrated engravers William Turner Davey and Lumb Stocks were both apprenticed to Rolls, Stocks from 30 November 1826, with a ‘consideration’ of £315, paid by his father.

He died on 9 November 1885 at his home, Oakdene, South Laurie Park, Penge, London and is buried in Nunhead Cemetery.

Gallery

References

External links
  An engraving of Henry Thomson's painting, for The Literary Souvenir annual for 1828, with illustrative verse by Letitia Elizabeth Landon
  An engraving of Henry Corbould's painting, in Forget Me Not annual for 1831, with illustrative verse by Letitia Elizabeth Landon
  An engraving of Henry Howard's painting, in The Keepsake annual for 1832, with illustrative verse by Letitia Elizabeth Landon
 , an engraving of Gilbert Stuart Newton's painting, in The Amulet annual for 1833, with illustrative verse by Letitia Elizabeth Landon
  An engraving Gilbert Stuart Newton's painting for The Literary Souvenir annual, 1833, with the poem On a Picture Representing an Italian Contadina and her Family by Felicia Hemans.
 , an engraving of Henry Wyatt's painting, in The Amulet annual for 1835 (page 7), with illustrative verse by Letitia Elizabeth Landon
 , an engraving of a painting by J. Inskip in The Amulet annual for 1836, with illustrative verse by Letitia Elizabeth Landon

1799 births
1885 deaths
People from Bermondsey
British engravers
19th-century engravers
Burials at Nunhead Cemetery